A nuclear war is a war in which nuclear weapons are used.

Nuclear War may also refer to:
Nuclear War (card game)
Nuclear War (video game)
Nuclear War, an album by Sun Ra, and its title track
Nuclear War, an EP by Yo La Tengo
"Nuclear War (On the Dance Floor)", a song by Electric Six from Fire